The Cairns Cyclones were a rugby league team that competed in the QRL Queensland Cup competition from 1996 to 2000. The inaugural 1996 team included the Captain/Coach and six first grade players from CDRL's Smithfield-based Ivanhoes Rugby League Club.

History 
After a great first year in 1996 when they made the Preliminary Finals, they dropped down the ladder in subsequent seasons, finishing in last place in 2000. A lack of support from locals and other Cairns rugby league clubs, combined with increasing financial difficulties, meant the Cyclones withdrew from the Competition at the end of the 2000 season.

North Queensland was represented in the Queensland Cup from 2002-2007 by the Townsville North Queensland Young Guns, who were a feeder club to the North Queensland Cowboys. (The Queensland Cup was known as the Bundy Gold Cup from 2000-2001, the Queensland Cup from 2002-2004 and the Queensland Wizard Cup from 2005-2007).

In 2008 the rationalisation of rugby league below the NRL level meant the North Queensland Young Guns entered the NRL under 20's competition and the northern expansion of the Queensland Cup saw the establishment of a new Cairns-based QRL side, the Northern Pride.

Staff
 Manager: Nigel Tillett
 Coach: Gary Smith (19961999, formerly CDRL Ivanhoes Knights), Brad Tessman (2000).

Colours
The Cyclones' colours were traditionally green, white and gold.

Home ground
The Cyclones' home ground was Barlow Park in Cairns. The playing field is 114 metres long (100 metres of field plus two 7 metre in goal areas) by 68 metres wide. The facility is floodlit for night games with four towers providing 620 lux. The venue has a capacity of 15,000 which includes 1,700 seats (mostly undercover). The car park can accommodate approximately 300 vehicles.

1996 season - 8 home games (won 5, lost 3)
1997 season - 7 home games (won 3, drew 1, lost 3)
1998 season - 7 home games (won 1, drew 1, lost 5)
1999 season - 7 home games (won 3, lost 4)
2000 season - home games (won, lost )

Seasons

1996 season

Channel Nine Cup: Finished 5th on the Premiership table after winning 10 of their 15 games. Lost the Preliminary semi-final 12-16 to Easts Tigers at Barlow Park.

1997 season

Channel Nine Cup

1998 season

Queensland Cup

1999 season

Queensland Cup

2000 season

Bundy Gold CupCairns Cyclones Bundy Gold Cup 2000 season statistics can be found here.

Cairns Cyclones Players (and seasons played) 

Aaron Port: 1997
Adam Bowditch: 2000
Adam Connolly: 1999
Andrew Bulmer: 1997
Andy Henley: 1996-7
Anthony Sexton: 2000
Ben Heath: 1999
Ben Rauter: 1999
Ben Zamatarro: 1997
Boyd Lorimer: 1997
Brad Coey-Braddon: 2000
Brett Blennerhassett: 1998
Brian Balderson: 1998
Brian Fourmile: 1996
Bronson Ryan: 2000
Cameron McNab: 1999
Chad Halliday: 1999
Chad Prien: 1996 & 1999
Chris Kelly: 1996
Chris Muckett: 1999
Chris Vanoletti: 1996
Cian Jacobs: 1997
Clint Arnol: 2000
Clint Zammit: 2000

Colin Prince: 1998
Craig Cygler: 1996-7
David Maiden: 1996-7
Denny Lambert: 1999
Duncn Naawi: 1998
Fabian Della Bosca: 1997
Gavin Sant: 1997
Greg Burke: 1999
Jaime McIntosh 1998-2000
Jason Barsley: 1998 & 2000
Jason Berg: 1999-2000
John Bolsem: 1998
John Clifford: 1996-7
John Doyle: 1999
John Manning: 1999
Karl Dawson: 1998-2000
Kerry Amory: 2000
Lama Ahmat: 2000
Leigh McWilliams: 1999
Leon Yeatman: 1999/2000
Liam Johnson: 1999
Mark Fakahua: 2000
Matt Clifford: 1996
Matt Hensler: 1996
Michal Mahoney: 1997

Mick Cooney: 1999
Mick Skardon: 1996-7
Nathan Butterworth: 1997-8
Nathan Fein: 1999
Nathan Woods: 1996-7
Neil Stanley: 2000
Nick Patterson: 1999
Noel Haslem: 1998
Noel Slade: 2000
Patrick Gardner: 2000
Paul Dezolt: 1999
Paul Fowler: 1996-7, 1999 & 2000
Paul Ketchell: 1998
Paul Pensini: 1999
Peter Dangerfield: 1997
Peter Deaves: 1996-7 & 1999
Phil Yanner: 1998
Quinton Nicol: 2000
Richard Murgha: 1996-7
Robbie Hollingsworth: 1996
Robbie Schmidt: 1996-7
Rober David: 1998
Scott Asimus: 1999
Scott Donald: 1999
Scott Mahon: 1999

Scott Manns: 1997
Scott Prince: 1999
Scott Tronc: 1996
Scott Williamson: 2000
Shane Medhurst : 1997-8
Shane Muspratt: 1999
Shane Vivian (Lock): 1997
Shannon Furber: 2000
Shannon Van Balen: 1996-7 & 1999
Stephen Tillett: 1997
Sterling Fourmile: 1998
Steve Howlett: 1996
Steve Singleton: 1998 & 2000
Steve Womal: 1996
Steven Hepworth: 1997
Swaggie Nona: 1998
Tasman Van Balen: 1997
Tim Kopp: 2000
Troy Lorimer: 1996-7
Ty Walter: 2000
Ty Williams 2000
Victor Akiba: 2000
Wade Backmann: 1999
Wes Davies: 1998

See also

References

External links
 Cairns Cyclones Statistics retrieved 7 December 2005
 Northern Pride Official site

Sports clubs disestablished in 2000
Rugby league teams in Queensland
Sport in Cairns
Rugby clubs established in 1996